Mi corazón insiste en Lola Volcán (My Heart Beats for Lola Volcan) is a Spanish-language telenovela produced by the United States-based television network Telemundo.

Telemundo aired the serial from May 23 to November 28, 2011, at 8pm central. As with most of its other telenovelas, the network broadcasts English subtitles as closed captions on CC3. It is a remake of Colombian telenovela of 1998-1999 Yo amo a Paquita Gallego by Julio Jimenez.

Plot 
"Love is an adrenaline and feeling in which the world disappears when you cling to a woman who loves and hates with the force of a volcano. Only she has wept in silence of suffering, lives intensely in the pain, and loves in the hours of true happiness; Because she is Lola Volcán ..."

Cast

Main 
 Carmen Villalobos as María Dolores "Lola" Volcán
 Jencarlos Canela as Andrés Suárez / Andrés Santacruz
 Angélica María as Isabel "Chabela" Volcán
 Ana Layevska as Débora Noriega, main female villain, hates Lola, obsessed with Andres, mistress of Marcelo, murdered him, killed by Diana
 Fabián Ríos as Ángel Meléndez, main male villain, in love with Lola, killed Tiberio, Fulgencio and Diana, shot by Andres to save Lola

Secondary 
 Katie Barberi as Victoria "Vicky" de Noriega, villain, later turns good
 Carlos Torres as Rodrigo Suárez
 Rossana San Juan as Soledad Volcán
 Gerardo Murguía as Marcelo Santacruz, villain, hates Andres and Lola, kills Veronica, murdered by Debora
 Alejandro Suárez as Diógenes Rugeles
 Liannet Borrego as Verónica Alcázar
 Mauricio Hénao as Daniel Santacruz, villain, later good
 Carlos Ferro as Camilo Andrade
 Cynthia Olavarría as Sofía Palacios
 Roberto Huicochea as José "Pepe" Linares
 Rubén Morales as Ramón Noriega, villain, accomplice of Marcelo
 Paloma Márquez as Adela "Adelita" Linares
 Lino Martone as Fulgencio López
 Jeannette Lehr as María Etelvina Rengifo / Eduviges Rengifo
 Carolina Tejera as Diana Mirabal, villain, in love with Andres, has a baby from Angel, killed by him
 Roberto Mateos as Tiberio Guzman, villain, mafiosi, real father of Lola, raps Soledad, killed by Angel

Recurring 
 Adrián Di Monte as Papi
 Jonathan Freudman as Pancho

Guest 
 Elluz Peraza as Laura Palacios

Awards and nominations

Broadcasters

Broadcasters in United States, Canada and Puerto Rico

International Broadcasters 
 on Pink BH at 2012 as Moje srce kuca za Lolu

 on Pink TV at 2012 as Moje srce kuca za Lolu

 on Pink M at 2012 as Moje srce kuca za Lolu

References

External links 
Club de Noveleras (Spanish)
Telemundo Press Release
Seriesnow

2011 telenovelas
2011 American television series debuts
2011 American television series endings
American television series based on telenovelas
Telemundo telenovelas
Television series by Universal Television
Spanish-language American telenovelas
American television series based on Colombian television series